Boddington may refer to:

People
Boddington (surname)

Places
Boddington, Gloucestershire, England
RAF Boddington was nearby
Boddington, Northamptonshire, Newcastle 
Boddington, Western Australia, town near Perth, Western Australia
Shire of Boddington, local government Australia

See also
Boddingtons, brewery brand